Regional Basketball League may refer to: 

 United Basketball League, a spring semi-professional basketball league in the Southern United States
 Regional Basketball League (Lithuania)